Blake Ashton Snell (born December 4, 1992), is an American professional baseball pitcher for the San Diego Padres of Major League Baseball (MLB). The Tampa Bay Rays selected Snell in the first round of the 2011 Major League Baseball draft.  He made his MLB debut with the Rays in 2016 and won the Cy Young Award in the American League (AL) in 2018, when he was an All-Star and led the league in both wins and earned run average (ERA).

Early life
Snell attended Shorewood High School in Shoreline, Washington, where he played for the baseball team. In high school, he trained at a facility owned by his father, a former minor league baseball player. In his senior season, Snell recorded a 9–0 win–loss record, a 1.00 ERA with 128 strikeouts in over 63 innings pitched.

Professional career

Draft and minor leagues
The Tampa Bay Rays selected Snell in the first round of the 2011 Major League Baseball draft. He signed with the Rays and made his professional debut with the Gulf Coast Rays, where he was 1–2 with a 3.08 ERA in 11 games (eight starts). He spent 2012 with the Princeton Rays, pitching to a 5–1 record and a 2.09 ERA in 11 starts, and 2013 with the Bowling Green Hot Rods where he compiled a 4–9 record and a 4.27 ERA in 23 starts.

Snell started 2014 with Bowling Green and was promoted to the Charlotte Stone Crabs in May. On August 2, he pitched a rain-shortened no-hitter against the Daytona Cubs. It was the first no-hitter in Stone Crabs history. In 24 total games started between the two clubs, he was 8–8 with a 3.19 ERA. After the season, he was named the Rays Minor League Pitcher of the Year. Snell started 2015 with the Stone Crabs and was promoted to the Montgomery Biscuits after allowing no runs in 21 innings to start the season. He was later promoted to the Durham Bulls. In 25 games (23 starts) between the three clubs, he was 15–4 with a 1.41 ERA and a 1.02 WHIP. The Rays added him to their 40-man roster after the season. Snell began the 2016 season with Durham.

Tampa Bay Rays (2016–2020)

2016–2017
Snell was promoted to the major leagues to make his debut on April 23, 2016, at Yankee Stadium. His first inning showed jitters, as he allowed a run off of a wild pitch, but he calmed down after that, striking out the side in the second inning, and retired 12 of the last 14 batters he faced. Through the 2016 season for Tampa, Snell made 19 starts, finishing with a 6–8 record, 3.54 ERA, and 98 strikeouts over 89 innings.

At the beginning of the 2017 season, Snell failed to work into the sixth inning in almost all of his first eight games, and was routinely touching 100 pitches in the fourth inning. After posting an ERA of 4.71 through eight starts in 2017, he was demoted to Durham on May 13. On June 28, Snell was recalled and his turnaround was evident. After July 23, Snell went 5–1 with a 3.31 ERA to finish the season with 24 starts, recording 119 strikeouts over  innings with a 4.04 ERA.

2018: Cy Young Award
Snell opened the 2018 season as the number two starter, behind Chris Archer. On June 3, he tied an AL record by striking out the first seven batters he faced in a game against the Seattle Mariners at Safeco Field. Snell ended the game allowing no runs in six innings and recorded 12 strikeouts. This was his first career start at Safeco Field in front of many of his friends and family, an estimated 300, including the first professional start witnessed by his grandfather, whom he considers a mentor.

At the time of the All-Star team announcement, Snell was 12–4 with a 2.09 ERA, the lowest of all qualified pitchers in the American League. Despite his success, he was not named to the original AL roster. This led to wide criticism of the selection process by players, coaches, fans, and analysts. After Corey Kluber opted out of the All-Star game due to injury, Snell was named his replacement, ending the controversy and awarding him his first career All-Star appearance.

On July 23, Snell was put on the 10-day disabled list with shoulder fatigue. He was reactivated on August 4 against the Chicago White Sox. On August 21, Snell set a new MLB record with his 13th straight start allowing one earned run or fewer at home. After he allowed two runs at home against the Baltimore Orioles, his streak ended at 14. Snell was the American League Pitcher of the Month for August, during which he went 4–0 with a 1.08 ERA over five starts.

On September 18, Snell recorded his 20th victory on the season, becoming the first Ray to accomplish this since David Price in 2012. On September 23, he won his 21st game, setting a franchise record after pitching 6 scoreless innings with 11 strikeouts against the Toronto Blue Jays. He was again named the American League Pitcher of the Month for September, in which he went 5–0 with a 1.26 ERA and 53 strikeouts over 35 innings. Snell became the youngest pitcher to win the award in consecutive months since Johan Santana in 2004.

Snell finished his breakout season leading the majors in wins (21), adjusted ERA+ (219), and batting average against (.178), as well as leading the American League in earned run average (1.89) and wins above replacement among pitchers (7.5). His 1.89 ERA was the lowest in the American League since Pedro Martinez posted a 1.74 in 2000, and the third-lowest in the AL since the designated hitter was introduced in 1973. He allowed two or fewer runs in 27 of his 31 starts and one or zero runs in 21 starts. Against the American League's five playoff teams, he went 9–2 with a 2.00 ERA. He led all major league pitchers in left on base percentage, stranding 88.0% of base runners. For the season, he also had the lowest percentage of balls pulled against him (33.8%) among major league pitchers, and led major league pitchers in lowest contact percentage (66.6%).

On November 14, Snell won the American League Cy Young Award, topping runner-up Justin Verlander by 15 points (169–154) and receiving 17 of 30 first-place votes. He became the second Rays pitcher to win the award, after Price in 2012.

2019
On March 21, 2019, Snell agreed to a five-year contract worth $50 million to keep him with the Rays through the 2023 season; it is the largest deal given to a major league pitcher before they reached salary arbitration. In spring training, Snell was named the Opening Day starter for the 2019 season, earning the loss in a 5–1 defeat against Verlander and the Houston Astros. His first win that season was a 4-0 victory over the Colorado Rockies, pitching 13 strikeouts and just two hits in seven innings. On April 16, Snell was placed on the injured list after breaking a toe on his right foot while moving furniture in his bathroom, and missed two starts. On July 25, it was announced that he would undergo arthroscopic surgery to remove loose bodies from his left elbow. Due to multiple trips to the disabled list, Snell finished with a 6–8 record in 23 starts. He struck out 147 batters in 107 innings.

On October 8, Snell made his first career appearance as a reliever and closer, and earned the save against Houston Astros working  of an inning, tying the American League Divisional Series at two games apiece.

2020
Before the start of the delayed MLB season, Snell caused some controversy when he said that he was more concerned about his pay than health when it comes to decisions to return to play during the COVID-19 pandemic. He said, "I'm not playing unless I get mine ... That's just the way it is for me," later admitting that his words could be taken as selfish. Commentators said his remarks were seen as "outrageously out-of-touch" during the pandemic.

In the pandemic-shortened season, Snell was 4–2 with a 3.24 ERA. He tied the record for the AL lead in wild pitches, with seven.

Snell started the first game of the postseason against the Toronto Blue Jays in the American League Wild Card Series. He took a no-hitter into the 6th inning as the Rays won 3-1. Snell started Game 1 of the American League Division Series against the New York Yankees. He allowed four runs through five innings as the Rays lost the game 9–3. The Rays won the series in five games. Snell started Games 1 and 6 of the American League Championship Series against the Houston Astros. He allowed one run through five innings in Game 1 and two runs through four innings in Game 6. The Rays won Game 1 and lost Game 6, advancing to the World Series after a Game 7 victory. In Game 2 of the World Series against the Los Angeles Dodgers, Snell allowed two runs and struck out nine batters in 4.2 innings. He became the first player in World Series history to strike out nine or more batters in fewer than five innings pitched. His nine strikeouts set a franchise postseason record. The Rays won the game 6–4. In Game 6 with the Rays leading 1–0 with one out, Snell was pulled by Kevin Cash for Nick Anderson in the 6th inning after pitching a shutout with two hits and nine strikeouts. The Dodgers then scored two runs in that inning and would go on to win the game 3–1 and the World Series for the first time since 1988, resulting in criticism by fans and baseball media.

San Diego Padres (2021–present)

2021
On December 29, 2020, the Rays traded Snell to the San Diego Padres in exchange for prospects Luis Patiño, Blake Hunt, and Cole Wilcox, along with catcher Francisco Mejía.
For the Padres, Snell slotted in as the team's number 2 pitcher. Snell regressed a bit in 2021, as he ended the year with a 7-6 record, and a 4.20 ERA over 27 starts. Snell initially had trouble going deep into games, not completing six innings until his ninth start of the year.  After two more starts where he failed to get out of the fourth inning, Snell pitched seven shut-out innings against the Mets on June 4, giving up only one hit.  Snell missed a pair of starts in the summer due to a bout with food poisoning. Snell finished strong, posting a 1.83 ERA is his final eight starts of the year, including seven innings of no-hit ball against the Diamondbacks on August 31.  He left his September 12 start early due to left adductor tightness. He was placed on the IL the following day, and he would not return.

2022
Snell's preparations for the 2022 season were interrupted by the lockout, and he was behind the other starting pitchers in building innings in spring training.  In his first scheduled start of the regular season, Snell again felt adductor tightness while warming up in the bullpen and he did not pitch in the game.  After going to the IL, Snell returned to the starting rotation on May 18, pitching 3 innings against the Phillies.  With Snell's return, the Padres opted to go with a 6-man rotation to keep MacKenzie Gore in the starting line-up and lower stress on arms.

Personal life
Snell grew up a Seattle Mariners fan. His nickname "Snellzilla" originally belonged to his oldest brother, but he seized it for himself at age eleven.

Snell owned a home in St. Petersburg, Florida but sold it for $1.4 million in 2021. He resides in Lynnwood, Washington during the offseason.

References

External links

1992 births
Living people
Baseball players from Seattle
Major League Baseball pitchers
American League All-Stars
American League ERA champions
American League wins champions
Cy Young Award winners
Tampa Bay Rays players
San Diego Padres players
Gulf Coast Rays players
Princeton Rays players
Bowling Green Hot Rods players
Charlotte Stone Crabs players
Montgomery Biscuits players
Durham Bulls players
Twitch (service) streamers
Shorewood High School (Washington) alumni